Raphael Carter is an American science fiction author who moved from Phoenix, Arizona, to Minneapolis, Minnesota, in 1995.

Work
Carter's first novel is the postcyberpunk The Fortunate Fall (1996). Acclaimed as "a superb example of speculative fiction," it appeared on Locus recommended reading list, and in the Locus Award it was 4th among first novels, after two tied winners. It caused Carter to be nominated for the John W. Campbell Award for Best New Writer in 1997 and 1998.

Carter's short story "'Congenital Agenesis of Gender Ideation' by K.N. Sirsi and Sandra Botkin" was shortlisted for the Theodore Sturgeon Award and won the James Tiptree, Jr. Award in 1998. This makes Carter the first non-female to be the sole winner of the Tiptree (Elizabeth Hand in 1995 was a co-winner with Theodore Roszak); Carter "does not identify as male or female" and wrote the "Androgyny Rarely Asked Questions" and "The Murk Manual: How to Understand Medical Writing on Intersex".

Between May 1998 and April 2002, Carter maintained the Honeyguide Web Log - an "eclectic weekly list of links emphasizing books, robotics, and the natural sciences." This was the first site to be named a weblog after Jorn Barger's example, and Carter launched the first weblog directory at the Open Directory Project in November 1998.

See also
The Fortunate Fall
Tor Books

References

Further reading
Patrick and Teresa Nielsen Hayden: "Anatomy of a Sale: Raphael Carter's The Fortunate Fall to Tor Books." In The Science Fiction and Fantasy Writer's Sourcebook, 2nd ed., ed. David Borcherding. Cincinnati: Writer's Digest Press, 1996.

External links
 Raphael Carter's Usenet posts at Google Groups:  1993-5, 1996-8 and 1998-9
 
 Judges' comments on the Congenital Agenesis... at Tiptree Award site
 Honeyguide Web Log at the Internet Archive
 Raphael Carter's photostream at Flickr
 Raphael Carter's contributions to the Wikimedia Commons

Year of birth missing (living people)
Living people
20th-century American novelists
Cyberpunk writers
American bloggers
American science fiction writers
Transgender writers
20th-century American short story writers